Ernest Trevor Hall (born 24 February 1905 in Cambridge, New Zealand – died in  in Papakura, New Zealand) was a New Zealand landlord, salesman, and professional rugby league footballer who played in the 1920s and 1930s, and coached in the 1930s.

Playing career

International honours
Hall won caps for New Zealand, he played left-, i.e. number 11, in the 5-13 defeat by England at Caledonian Ground, Dunedin on Saturday 18 August 1928, and played  in the 5-6 defeat by England at English Park, Christchurch on Saturday 25 August 1928, and represented Other Nationalities while at St. Helens against England.

Regional honours
Hall represented Auckland in the 12-29 defeat by South Auckland in the 1927 Northern Union Cup, played  in the 14-19 defeat by Great Britain on the 1932 Great Britain Lions tour of Australia and New Zealand during the 1932 New Zealand rugby league season, and represented Auckland City in the 15-26 defeat by Great Britain on the 1928 Great Britain Lions tour of Australia and New Zealand during the 1928 New Zealand rugby league season.

Challenge Cup Final appearances
Trevor Hall played left-, i.e. number 11, in St. Helens' 3–10 defeat by Widnes in the 1929–30 Challenge Cup Final at Wembley Stadium, London on Saturday 3 May 1930, in front of a crowd of 36,544.

Club career
Hall played in Newton Rangers' victory in the 1927 Auckland Rugby League's competition, and the 6-3 victory over Ponsonby in the 1927 Stormont Shield.

References

External links
Profile at saints.org.uk

1905 births
1961 deaths
Auckland rugby league team players
Dominion XIII rugby league team players
New Zealand landlords
New Zealand national rugby league team players
new Zealand expatriate sportspeople in England
New Zealand rugby league coaches
New Zealand rugby league players
Newton Rangers players
North Island rugby league team players
Other Nationalities rugby league team players
Rochdale Hornets coaches
Rochdale Hornets players
Rugby league locks
Rugby league players from Hamilton, New Zealand
Rugby league second-rows
St Helens R.F.C. players